These are Sheffield Wednesday F.C. records. They cover all competitive matches dating back to the team's first appearance in the FA Cup in 1880.

Record Games

Seasonal records

Record Runs
All records relate to league games only

Players

General

Transfers

Appearances and goals

Highest Average attendance in a season

Honours

Top tier

Lower tier

Local

References

Club records (last accessed 28 July 2006)
Appearances (last accessed 28 July 2006)
Goalscorers (last accessed 28 July 2006)
Honours (last archived 15 October 2012)
Club Records (last accessed 1 September 2016)
Record Signing (last accessed 1 September 2016)

Records
Sheffield Wednesday